is a Japanese political scientist. He has held many roles such as the president of the Japan International Cooperation Agency (JICA), president of the International University of Japan, professor at Japan's GRIPS-Tokyo School of Security and International Studies, and Japanese ambassador to the United Nations. His area of expertise is the history of Japanese politics and diplomacy, as a political scientist and a historian.

Early life
Kitaoka was born in Yoshino, Nara Prefecture. His family owned a sake brewing business and both his father and grandfather had served as the mayor of Yoshino. His great uncle was Juitsu Kitaoka, economist and former official of the Ministry of Labor.

Kitaoka graduated with a B.L. in June 1971 and received his Ph.D. of Law from the University of Tokyo in September 1976. While studying at the University of Tokyo he lived at the all-male dormitory Wakeijuku.

Career
Kitaoka took a lecturership at Rikkyo University; he became a full professor there in 1985. In 1997, he moved to a position at the University of Tokyo.

In 2004, he was appointed as Japan's ambassador and deputy permanent representative to the United Nations, a position he held until 2006 when he returned to academia.

In 2006-2010, Kitaoka was the Japanese chair of the Japan-China Joint History Research Committee.  Among other topics, the committee investigated the Nanking Massacre. From 2009-2010, he chaired a Ministry of Foreign Affairs committee on the so-called Secret Agreements between the U.S. and Japan on the introduction of nuclear weapons into Japanese territory.

Kitaoka was the Deputy Chairman of the Advisory Panel on Reconstruction of the Legal Basis for Security, an advisory panel to Prime Minister Abe on the possibility of re-interpreting constitutional provisions to allow for collective self-defense.

Awards
In 2011 he was awarded the Medal with Purple Ribbon for his academic contributions.

Publications
Japanese language

English translations

References

External links
 Kitaoka's GRIPS web page, retrieved May 15, 2014.
  "The First Meeting of The Japan-China Joint History Research Committee (Summary)," December 2006"

1948 births
Living people
Academic staff of the International University of Japan
People from Nara Prefecture
University of Tokyo alumni
Academic staff of the University of Tokyo
Academic staff of Rikkyo University
Academic staff of National Graduate Institute for Policy Studies
Japanese political scientists
20th-century Japanese historians
Historians of Japan
Recipients of the Medal of Honor (Japan)
21st-century Japanese historians